Charles Whittlesey may refer to:

 Charles Whittlesey (geologist) (1808–1886), American geologist and archeologist
 Charles Frederick Whittlesey (1867–1941), American architect
 Charles White Whittlesey (1884–c. 1921), American soldier
 Charles Whittlesey (lawyer) (1819–1874), Connecticut lawyer, Union soldier and briefly Virginia Attorney General
 Charles Whittlesey (politician) (1807–1863), American politician in Iowa